Hakea orthorrhyncha, commonly known as  bird beak hakea, is a shrub which is endemic to the Murchison River area of Western Australia.

Description
The bright red flowers appear in axillary clusters in the leaf nodes on older growth along the branches from early winter to early spring.

Taxonomy and naming
The species was first described in 1868 by botanist Ferdinand von Mueller who gave it the specific epithet orthorrhyncha which is derived from the Greek orthos  "straight" and rhynchos "beak" alluding to the straight beak on the seed capsules. The common name, bird beak hakea, is presumed to be a confusion between the Greek words for straight and bird.

There are two varieties of the species, based on differing foliage characteristics:

This variety grows in the Murchison River to Mingenew area.
This variety is confined to the northern sandplains of the Kalbarri region.

Distribution and habitat
Hakea orthorrhyncha grows on the Geraldton sand plains on grey sand, loam and granite.

References

orthorrhyncha
Eudicots of Western Australia
Taxa named by Ferdinand von Mueller
Plants described in 1868